Jayasimha (born 6 November 1983), better known as Bobby Simha, is an Indian actor who predominantly appears in Tamil and Telugu language films, alongside a few Malayalam-language films. After making brief appearances in the films Kadhalil Sodhappuvadhu Yeppadi and Pizza (2012), he portrayed a kidnapper in Nalan Kumarasamy's Soodhu Kavvum and a comic villain in Alphonse Putharen's Neram. Simha's subsequent performance as the Madurai gangster Sethu in Karthik Subbaraj's Jigarthanda (2014) won him critical acclaim and the National Film Award for Best Supporting Actor.

Early life
Bobby Simha was born to a Telugu speaking family on 6 November 1983 in Secundrabad, Andhra Pradesh (now Telangana). Simha's family is from Mopidevi, Krishna District, Andhra Pradesh but they moved to Kodaikanal in 1995. He subsequently completed his schooling at Priyadarshini Vidyalayam, a Telugu Medium School, in Mopidevi, Krishna District, Andhra Pradesh and then attended college at Pioneer College of Arts and Science in Coimbatore.
In 2005, he participated in a Coimbatore-based event called Naalaya Natchathiram, where chief guests Sundar C and E. Ramdoss suggested that he should attempt to become an actor in Tamil films. Simha stated that he received an offer to feature in a TV serial in Chennai and only after making the journey from Coimbatore, did he realise he had been conned. Simha subsequently finished his degree and came back to Chennai to pursue a career in acting but ended up working in marketing, insurance and business process outsourcing to fulfill his financial needs.

Career

2007-2012: Debut roles

Bobby Simha appeared in uncredited role in Maya Kannadi (2007). Balaji Mohan, was short-film maker, gave a small role in his first feature film, Kadhalil Sodhappuvadhu Yeppadi. Both ventures became critically acclaimed and amongst the most profitable of 2012.  He subsequently became acquainted with short-film maker Manikandan, who introduced him to his friend, another short-film maker Karthik Subbaraj. The pair subsequently made a series of short films together, with Subbaraj giving Simha a role in his directorial debut Pizza, too.

2013-2017: Critically acclaimed 

Simha then appeared in Soodhu Kavvum (2013) portraying the role of Pagalavan, and played the antagonist in the bilingual Neram, his performances in both films were received well. In 2014, he was seen in the role of an ageing Madurai gangster in Jigarthanda with his portrayal winning him critical praise. In an interview he said that in order to get into the character, he had interacted with real gangsters to learn their behaviour and nuances. To tan his skin, he stood in the sun at noon wearing only his shorts. The film opened to positive reviews in August 2014, with The Hindu writing that it had achieved "cult status" within a week of its release. Simha won positive reviews for his depiction of Sethu, with Rediff.com noting that Simha "steals the show. He is chillingly menacing at times, while completely hilarious in others, but equally convincing in both", stating it is "a truly remarkable performance". A critic from Sify.com delivered a similar verdict, writing "truly the film belongs to Simhaa. He is electrifying especially in the first half, where he brings out the viciousness and violent streak of the character along with that eerie laughter." His performance in the film earned him the National Film Award for Best Supporting Actor. After Jigarthanda he played a lead role in the Malayalam film Beware of Dogs, while in Aadama Jaichomada he played Bhoominathan, a "serious, intelligent cop but with a comic touch". The success of Jigarthanda had created opportunities for Bobby Simha to become a lead actor, though several of his subsequent films did not perform well commercially. In December 2015, he appeared in Urumeen, his first film as a solo action hero.

In 2016, he appeared in the coming-of-age drama, Bangalore Naatkal, where he portrayed a softer role in comparison to his earlier action films. Simha had offered his own dates to the producers to portray a character in the film, with his performance receiving mixed reviews. He play the role of a young and enthusiastic reporter in political thriller Ko 2. Director Karthik Subbaraj scripts a story of male arrogance in the multi-starrer Iraivi. In 2017, Susi Ganesan's Thiruttu Payale 2 is the sequel to the 2006 thriller film which went on to become a hit at the box-office.

2018-present
He has signed to play as antagonist for Saamy Square (2018), which is the sequel of Saamy, directed by Hari.

Bobby Simah's first release of the year 2019 was Petta, in which he shared screen space with superstar Rajinikanth. He later went on to do Agni Devi and Edaina Jaragocchu. 

In November 2019, Film Companion ranked Simha's performance in Jigarthanda among the 100 Greatest Performances of the decade.

In 2020, he has play the antagonist with Ravi Teja's in Telegu movie Disco Raja. He was seen in Amazon Prime Video’s Anthology Putham Pudhu Kaalai, where he played the lead role in Karthik Subbaraj’s segment titled, Miracle. In 2022, Bobby Simha play in pivotal role with Vikram in Mahaan directed by Karthik Subbaraj exclusively on Prime Video. Later, Bobby Simha play a cameo for his debut in the Kannada film industry with Rakshit Shetty's 777 Charlie. In Telugu, he did Ammu (2022) for Amazon Prime and worked with Megastar Chiranjeevi in Waltair Veerayya (2023) where he plays the villain. He is also playing pivotal roles in Vallavanukkum Vallavan (2023) and the project of S. Shankar, Indian 2 (2023) with Kamal Haasan.

Personal life 
Bobby Simha got engaged to actress Reshmi Menon in November 2015, and they married on 22 April 2016. The couple has two children– a daughter (born 2017), and a son (born 2019).

Awards

Vijay Awards 
 2014 – Vijay Award for Best Villain – Jigarthanda

Filmfare Awards South 
 2014 – Filmfare Award for Best Supporting Actor – Tamil – Jigarthanda

National Film Awards 
 2014 – National Film Award for Best Supporting Actor – Jigarthanda

Tamil Nadu State Film Award Special Prize 
 Best Actor  – Jigarthanda

3rd South Indian International Movie Awards
Nominated - Best Actor in a Supporting Role - Soodhu Kavvum
Nominated - Best Actor in a Negative Role (Tamil) - Neram
Nominated - Best Actor in a Negative Role (Malayalam) - Neram

4th South Indian International Movie Awards
Nominated - Best Actor in a Negative Role (Tamil) - Jigarthanda

Edison Awards
 2014 - Edison Award for Best Villain - Jigarthanda

Filmography

Feature films

Television Series

References

External links
 

Living people
Male actors from Tamil Nadu
Male actors in Tamil cinema
Best Supporting Actor National Film Award winners
1983 births
People from Dindigul district
21st-century Indian male actors
Indian male film actors